John Penrose (5 May 1850 – 21 April 1932) was a British archer who competed at the 1908 Summer Olympics in London. Penrose entered the double York round event in 1908, taking fourth place with 709 points.

References

External links
 profile
 
 

1850 births
1932 deaths
British male archers
Olympic archers of Great Britain
Archers at the 1908 Summer Olympics
20th-century British people